Prairie Valley is a station in Summerland, British Columbia, Canada, which is used by the Kettle Valley Steam Railway. The Canadian Pacific Railway no longer operates trains over the railway line, which was disconnected from the Canadian Pacific mainline and abandoned between 1961 and 1989. The Kettle Valley Steam Railway now operates steam excursion trains over the line.  This is the main boarding station for the KVSR.

Prairie Valley was never a Canadian Pacific station.  It was only put in for the tourist railway.

Railway stations in British Columbia